The 2006 Asian Men's Handball Championship was the twelfth Asian Championship and was held in Bangkok, Thailand from 12 to 21 February 2006. It acted as the Asian qualifying tournament for the 2007 World Men's Handball Championship in Germany.

Draw

* Withdrew

Preliminary round
All times are local (UTC+7).

Group A

Group B

Placement 5th–8th

7th/8th

5th/6th

Final round

Semifinals

Bronze medal match

Gold medal match

Final standing

External links
Goalzz
www.handball.jp
Results

Asian
Handball
Handball
Asian Handball Championships
February 2006 sports events in Thailand